Flowers & Liquor is the debut album released by American singer-songwriter Hayes Carll.

Track listing 
Songs written by Hayes Carll except where noted.
1. Highway 87 – 3:10

2. Heaven Above – 3:52

3. Naked Checkers – 4:24

4. Arkansas Blues – 5:18

5. It's A Shame – 4:53

6. Live Free or Die (Bill Morrissey, Trigger Cook) – 3:09

7. Easy Come Easy Go – 5:51

8. Flowers & Liquor – 2:50

9. Richey Lee – 5:27

10. Perfect Lover – 4:02

11. Lost & Lonely – 4:55

12. Barrom Lament – 4:55

Personnel 
Adapted from AllMusic.
 Hayes Carll – lead vocals, rhythm guitar, acoustic rhythm guitar
 Rick Richards – Drums
 David Carroll – upright bass, bass
 David Spencer – Dobro, electric guitar, electric lead guitar, acoustic guitar, acoustic lead guitar, rhythm guitar, steel guitar, slide guitar, background vocals
 Bert Wills – acoustic lead guitar, electric guitar
 Lisa Morales – acoustic guitar, background vocals
 Michael Ramos – accordion
 Roberta Morales – background vocals
 Jeff Plankehorn – Dobro

References 

Hayes Carll albums
2002 debut albums